The 2021 New Hampshire Wildcats football team represented the University of New Hampshire as a member of the Colonial Athletic Association (CAA) in the 2021 NCAA Division I FCS football season. The Wildcats, led by 22nd-year head coach Sean McDonnell, played their home games at Wildcat Stadium.

Previous season

With games delayed into the spring due to the COVID-19 pandemic, the Wildcats finished the 2020–21 season 0–1. After a loss to Albany on March 5, their next three games were postponed due to COVID concerns, and on April 6, the program opted out of the remainder of the season.

Schedule

References

New Hampshire
New Hampshire Wildcats football seasons
New Hampshire Wildcats football